Kalkan is a town on the Turkish Mediterranean coast, and an important tourist destination. The area includes historical sites (such as Tlos and Kekova) and fine beaches (including Patara Beach and Kaputaş Beach).

Kalkan is an old fishing town, and the only safe harbour between Kaş and Fethiye; it is known for its white-washed houses, descending to the sea, and its brightly coloured  bougainvilleas. It averages 300 days of sunshine a year.

Until the early 1920s, nearly all of its inhabitants were Greeks and the town was called Kalamaki. They left in 1923 during the exchange of populations between Greece and Turkey after the Greco-Turkish War and emigrated mainly to Attica, where they founded the new town of Kalamaki. Abandoned Greek houses can still be seen at Kalkan.

Kalkan was an important harbour town until the 1970s as the only seaport for the environs. It declined after construction of Fethiye road but revived after the emergence of the tourism industry in the region.

Although part of the Antalya province administratively, Kalkan is connected more closely to Fethiye economically and for transportation.

The Independent listed Kalkan among the best tourist destinations for 2007. The paper recommended Kalkan especially for those seeking a romantic vacation and who do not want to travel far from their home country in Europe. According to a 2012 survey 96% of visitors to Kalkan during 2011 were from the United Kingdom.

See also
 Kaputaş Beach

Footnotes

Kaş District
Turkish Riviera
Towns in Turkey
Populated coastal places in Turkey
Former Greek towns in Turkey
Fishing communities in Turkey
Populated places in Antalya Province